The Hays-Heighe House is a historic home located on the campus of Harford Community College near Bel Air, Harford County, Maryland, United States. It is a five bay long, two bay deep stone house with a gable roof and massive brick chimneys on each gable, built in 1808. On the east is a five bay long, two-story stone wing. Its initial owner, Thomas A. Hays, was one of the founders of the town of Bel Air.

The Hays-Heighe House was listed on the National Register of Historic Places in 1972.

References

External links
, including photo from 1971, Maryland Historical Trust website

Houses in Bel Air, Harford County, Maryland
Houses on the National Register of Historic Places in Maryland
Houses completed in 1808
National Register of Historic Places in Harford County, Maryland